Broshniv-Osada (Ukrainian: Бро́шнів-Оса́да) is an urban-type settlement in Kalush Raion, Ivano-Frankivsk Oblast, western Ukraine. It hosts the administration of Broshniv-Osada settlement hromada, one of the hromadas of Ukraine. Population: .

The first written record of its mention dates from 1890.

Until 18 July 2020, Broshniv-Osada belonged to Rozhniativ Raion. The raion was abolished in July 2020 as part of the administrative reform of Ukraine, which reduced the number of raions of Ivano-Frankivsk Oblast to six. The area of Rozhniativ Raion was merged into Kalush Raion.

Gallery

References

External links
Ukrainian Wiki Page of Broshniv-Osada
Photographs of Jewish sites in Broshniv-Osada in Jewish History in Galicia and Bukovina

Urban-type settlements in Kalush Raion